Onnum Onnum Moonu  is a 2015 Indian Malayalam comedy drama anthology film which will have three films in it, namely Kulukki Sarbath, Sabdarekha and Devi. It stars Kalabhavan Mani, M. R. Gopakumar, Arun, Boban Alummoodan, Sathaar, Riaz M T, Irshad and Leona Lishoy in the lead roles. Its music was composed by MS Sheikh Ilahi, Muralee Krishna and Shibu Joseph with lyrics penned by Philipose Thathampally and Santhosh Kodanadu. The film released on 8 September 2015.

List of short films

Cast
 Kalabhavan Mani
 Arun
 M. R. Gopakumar
 Boban Alummoodan
 Sathaar
 Riaz M T
 Indrans
 Irshad
 Leona Lishoy
 Ameer Niyas
 Riya Saira 
 Kalashala Babu
 Lakshmi Sanal
 Abhishek
 Surya Sankar
 Devasurya

Soundtrack
The original music and background score of the film, are composed, arranged, programmed and produced by MS Sheikh Ilahi, Muralee Krishna and Shibu Joseph

with lyrics penned by Philipose Thathampally and Santhosh Kodanadu.

Production
The Pooja of the film was held in February 2015 and the shooting set in the backdrop of Alappuzha picturizes the scenic beauty of Alappuzha and Kuttanadu.

References

 IMDb
 Movie Buff
 Cine Ulagam
 Malayala Sangeetham
 Film Beat
 Cochin Talkies
 Nana Online Weekly

External links
 

2015 romantic drama films
2015 films
Indian romantic drama films
Indian anthology films
2010s Malayalam-language films